South Ring Road is a station on Line 1 and Line 2 of Kunming Metro in Kunming, Yunnan, China, which opened in 2014. It is located in Guandu District. Nevertheless, due to the through operation between the two lines, passengers currently do not need to transfer at this station.

Station structure
The station has 2 island platforms, but only two platforms are currently in use, and the other two platforms are currently not in use. However, they will be put into service when Line 1 and Line 2 are separated in the future, serving Line 1 instead. On the other hand, the platforms currently in use will serve Line 2 only. Then, a same-direction cross-platform interchange will be provided between the two lines.

References

Railway stations in Yunnan
Railway stations in China opened in 2014